The La Garde Formation is a geologic formation in New Brunswick. It preserves fossils dating back to the Devonian period.

See also

 List of fossiliferous stratigraphic units in New Brunswick

References
 

Devonian New Brunswick
Devonian southern paleotemperate deposits